Missing Pieces is a digital album by Scottish rock band Biffy Clyro, released 14 May 2009. The album features B-sides from singles released from the band's 4th album Puzzle.

Overview 
The album was released in digital format, initially only available in America. It was subsequently made available in the UK. The album compiles B-sides from the singles "Saturday Superhouse", "Living Is a Problem Because Everything Dies", "Folding Stars", "Machines" and "Who's Got A Match?", along with several demo tracks that were previously exclusive to iTunes UK.

Track listing

Personnel 

Biffy Clyro
 Simon Neil - vocals, guitar
 James Johnston - vocals bass
 Ben Johnston - vocals, drums

 GGGarth Richardson – production
 Biffy Clyro – production

References 

Biffy Clyro albums
2008 compilation albums
B-side compilation albums
Beggars Banquet Records compilation albums